Teppe Zagheh is an early urban settlement located near Qazvin, Iran.
In Persian, Tappeh means "tell, mound". It was first excavated by a team from the University of Tehran under the direction of Ezzat Negahban in the early 1970s

Important finds 
- Discovery of a shrine with interior decoration.

- 23 graves of adults and infants with local and imported goods.

- Administrative artifacts such as tokens.

- Residential dwellings. 

It is suggested that the Painted Building was a special place for women to give birth

Chronology 
After the re-excavation of Zagheh in 2001, new radiocarbon dates were obtained. The radiocarbon estimations for the occupation of Zagheh between 5370–5070 BC and 4460–4240 BC. They indicate that the site was settled c. 5370–5070 BC and abandoned c. 4460–4240 BC. Thus, it may belong to Transitional Chalcolithic.

There were also many small clay 'tokens', used as counting objects, that were found at Zagheh; these are variously-shaped, and are similar to such tokens at other Neolithic sites. These Zagheh tokens are dated typologically to 6500–5500 BC. Thus, there were probably two periods of occupation.

Zagheh archaic painted ware (ca. 6000-5500 BC) was found in Tepe Sialk I, sub-levels 1-2. This is the early painted ware, that was first excavated at Teppe Zagheh.

Clay figurines found in Mehrgarh (Pakistan), an important precursor to the Indus Valley civilization, resemble those discovered at Teppe Zagheh, and at Jeitun in Turkmenistan (6th millennium BCE).
The faunal remains from the site were studied by Marjan Mashkour who identified Sheep, goats, wild goats, cattle, Gazelles, boars, dogs, and foxes.

Relative chronology

Notes

References 

Sabk Shenasi Mi'mari Irani (Study of styles in Iranian architecture), M. Karim Pirnia. 2005.

See also 
Iranian architecture

Populated places established in the 7th millennium BC
Populated places disestablished in the 5th millennium BC
Tells (archaeology)
Architecture in Iran
Archaeological sites in Iran
Prehistoric Iran
National works of Iran